Benedict I. "Sparky" Garmisa (May 22, 1913 – January 30, 1985) was an American politician.

Born in Chicago, Illinois, Garmisa served in the United States Army during World War II, He went to Northwestern University, Loyola University Chicago, and was the executive director for Chicago Street Traffic Commission. Garmisa was a Democrat. In 1955, Garmisa served in the Illinois State Senate and then in the Illinois House of Representatives. In 1956, Garmisa ran for Circuit Court Clerk for Cook County, Illinois and lost the election. Garmisa died in a hospital in West Palm Beach, Florida after suffering a heart attack while on vacation.

Notes

1913 births
1985 deaths
Politicians from Chicago
Loyola University Chicago alumni
Northwestern University alumni
Democratic Party Illinois state senators
Democratic Party members of the Illinois House of Representatives
20th-century American politicians
United States Army personnel of World War II